Gressitt's mosaic-tailed rat (Paramelomys gressitti) is a species of rodent native to Papua New Guinea. Ongoing habitat degradation is a major threat. It is named after the collector, Judson Linsley Gressitt.

References

Paramelomys